Sher Khan or Shir Khan may refer to:

Film
Sher Khan (1962 film), a Bollywood film of 1962 about Sher Shah Suri by Radhakant
Sher Khan (1981 film), a Pakistani Punjabi film starring Sultan Rahi, Anjuman and Mustafa Qureshi
Sher Khan (1998 film), an Indian action film featuring Jack Gaud

People
Sher Khan of Bengal, governor of North Bengal 1268–1272
Sher Shah Suri (1486–1545), founder of the Sur Empire and ruler of northern India in the 16th century
Sher Afghan Quli Khan (died 1607), Mughal courtier of the 17th century
Sher Akbar Khan (born 1957), Pakistani politician
Sher Ali Khan (1825–1879), Amir of Afghanistan between 1863 and 1879
Sher Khan Nashir, Afghan politician from Kunduz Province in the 1930s

Places

Afghanistan
Sher Khan Bandar, a border town in Kunduz Province of Afghanistan

India 
Kheri Sher Khan, village in Haryana, India

Iran
Shir Khan, Kermanshah
Shir Khan, Markazi
Shir Khan, Razavi Khorasan
Shir Khan, South Khorasan
Shir Khan, Zaveh, Razavi Khorasan Province

Other
Shere Khan, a fictional Bengal tiger and main antagonist of The Jungle Book